Signal transducing adapter molecule 1 is a protein that in humans is encoded by the STAM gene.

Function 

This gene was identified by the rapid tyrosine-phosphorylation of its product in response to cytokine stimulation. The encoded protein contains an SH3 domain and the immunoreceptor tyrosine-based activation motif (ITAM). This protein associates with JAK3 and JAK2 kinases via its ITAM region, and is phosphorylated by the JAK kinases upon cytokine stimulation, which suggests the function of this protein is as an adaptor molecule involved in the downstream signaling of cytokine receptors. HGS/HRS (hepatocyte growth factor-regulated tyrosine kinase substrate) has been found to bind and counteract the function of this protein. STAM1  contains multiple amino acid sites that are phosphorylated and ubiquitinated.

Interactions 

Signal transducing adaptor molecule has been shown to interact with
 HGS,
 Janus kinase 2.
MAP3K1,
 STAMBP, and
 TIMM8A.

References

Further reading